The Hooker Creek Events Center is a 7,500-seat multi-purpose arena in Redmond, Oregon, United States. The largest of several buildings on the Deschutes County Expo Center, it hosts sporting events and concerts.  It opened in 2000.

External links 
 

Sports venues in Oregon
Indoor arenas in Oregon
Buildings and structures in Redmond, Oregon
Tourist attractions in Deschutes County, Oregon
2000 establishments in Oregon
Sports venues completed in 2000